Blanqueado is an underground metro station on the Line 5 of the Santiago Metro, in Santiago, Chile. The station was opened on 12 January 2010 as part of the extension of the line from Quinta Normal to Pudahuel.

References

Santiago Metro stations
Railway stations opened in 2010